"Three Days" is a song written by Willie Nelson. It was originally recorded by American country music artist Faron Young on his 1961 album The Young Approach. Young's version was released as a single in January 1962 and peaked at number 7 on the Billboard Hot Country Singles chart.

Nelson recorded his own version of the song on his 1962 debut album, ...And Then I Wrote. He later re-recorded the song for his 1998 album Teatro with backing vocals by Emmylou Harris.

"Three Days" was also recorded by Canadian country music artist k.d. lang on her 1989 album Absolute Torch and Twang. lang's version was released in October 1989 as the album's second single. It peaked at number 9 on the RPM Country Tracks chart in January 1990.

On the 1996 Willie Nelson tribute album, Twisted Willie, the song was performed by L7 with backup vocals by Waylon Jennings.

Chart performance

Faron Young

k.d. lang

References

1961 songs
1962 singles
1989 singles
Willie Nelson songs
Faron Young songs
K.d. lang songs
Capitol Records singles
Sire Records singles
Songs written by Willie Nelson
Song recordings produced by Ken Nelson (American record producer)